Brayton Biekman (born 16 December 1978 in The Hague) is a Dutch footballer who plays in the Tweede Divisie for FC Lienden.

Club career
Biekman began playing amateur football with LMO, SHO, SC Feyenoord and the FC Utrecht youth. He made his professional debut for FC Den Bosch on 17 August 2003 with a 1-3 away win at HFC Haarlem. In 2004, FC Den Bosch was promoted to the Eredivisie, where he would appear in 14 matches. Halfway during the 2004–05 season, Biekman was loaned out to Excelsior Rotterdam. After 16 matches and 3 goals he returned to FC Den Bosch, who were relegated and began the 2005–06 season in the Eerste Divisie. Halfway during the 2005–06 season he was sold to Excelsior, who became Eerste Divisie champions that season. After 15 matches without a goal he went to Rijnsburgse Boys in the Zaterdag Hoofdklasse A.

Amateur football
After leaving Rijnsburgse Boys, he had spells at DOVO, Elinkwijk and Argon. He spent several seasons playing in the Hoofdklasse, with him moving to DFS from fellow Hoofdklasse side Bennekom in summer 2015. In January 2016, Biekman was announced as a new signing by Tweede Divisie outfit FC Lienden for the 2016/17 season.

References

1978 births
Living people
Footballers from The Hague
Dutch sportspeople of Surinamese descent
Association football forwards
Dutch footballers
FC Den Bosch players
Excelsior Rotterdam players
Rijnsburgse Boys players
USV Elinkwijk players
SV Argon players
Eredivisie players
Eerste Divisie players
VV DOVO players
FC Lienden players
SC Feyenoord players